Islands of Nyne: Battle Royale is a sci-fi-themed first person shooter battle royale video game by American developer Define Human Studios. The game launched in early access on Steam on July 12, 2018. On December 19, 2018, Define Human Studios stopped development of the game and made the game free to play.

History 
The game was crowdfunded on Kickstarter in 2016, raising $50,000. Islands of Nyne was released on Steam early access on July 12, 2018; the game reached a peak of over 7,200 concurrent players that month. On December 19, 2018, the game's development was halted due to financial issues, although the game was made free-to-play and servers were kept live for any players to continue playing.

References 

2018 video games
Battle royale games
Cancelled Windows games
Early access video games
First-person shooters
Video games developed in the United States
Windows games
Windows-only games